Bankner is a census town in North West district  in the state of Delhi, India.

Demographics
 India census, Bankner had a population of 21,085. Males constitute 52% of the population and females 48%. Bankner has an average literacy rate of 80%, higher than the national average of 59.5%; with 85% of the males and 75% of females literate. 16% of the population is under six years of age.

References

Cities and towns in North West Delhi district